The men's 1500 metre freestyle event at the 2018 Commonwealth Games was held on 10 April at the Gold Coast Aquatic Centre.

Records 
Prior to this competition, the existing world, Commonwealth and Games records were as follows:

Results 
There are no heats so there will only be a final for this event.

References 

Men's 1500 metre freestyle
Commonwealth Games